Chris Davies (born 27 March 1985) is a Welsh association football coach, who is the assistant manager of Premier League club Leicester City.

Playing career

Davies signed with Reading, aged 16, where he captained the youth team coached by Brendan Rodgers. He was also capped for the Wales Under-17, 18 and 19 team.

Despite appearing regularly for the Reading reserve team, Davies was forced to retire from professional football in 2004, aged 19, due to injury.

Coaching career

In 2004, Davies began his UEFA coaching licences while also attending Loughborough University and working in various youth coaching roles. He would go on to gain first-class honours in Sport Science.
 
In 2010, aged 25, Davies was recruited as an assistant coach by Swansea City. In his first season, Swansea City were promoted to the Premier League.
 
Davies moved with Brendan Rodgers to Liverpool in June 2012, and left his position at Liverpool on 8 October 2015. During his time at Liverpool, Davies completed his UEFA Pro Licence in 2015.

Davies rejoined Reading on 1 January 2016 as their first team coach. At 30-years-old, Davies became the youngest first team coach in the club's history.

In June 2016, Davies moved to Celtic, becoming assistant manager to Rodgers. In their first season in charge, Celtic won the domestic treble for only the fourth time in the club's history, as they reshaped the squad with youthful flair. Celtic would go on to break their own 100-year-old record for successive domestic games unbeaten, going 69 matches without defeat.

In February 2019, Davies moved with Rodgers to Leicester City, again as his assistant manager.

Personal life

Davies was born in Watford, to an English mother and Welsh father. He has one elder brother, Robert.

Davies is married to Danielle Davies whom he attended the same primary school with. They have 3 children.

References

Living people
1985 births
English footballers
Welsh footballers
English people of Welsh descent
Wales youth international footballers
Reading F.C. players
Reading F.C. non-playing staff
Leicester City F.C. non-playing staff
Swansea City A.F.C. non-playing staff
Liverpool F.C. non-playing staff
Celtic F.C. non-playing staff
Association football midfielders